Blue Mountain Alternative High School is a public alternative high school in John Day, Oregon, United States.

Academics
In 2008, 53% of the school's seniors received a high school diploma. Of 15 students, eight graduated, two dropped out, one received a modified diploma, and four were still in high school the following year.

References

High schools in Grant County, Oregon
Alternative schools in Oregon
Education in Grant County, Oregon
Public middle schools in Oregon
Public high schools in Oregon